Cameron Zubko (born 1975) is a Canadian businessman and Chief Operating Officer of Ice Wireless, a Canadian 4G/LTE telecommunications company.

In 2012, Zubko initiated a partnership between Ice Wireless and nationwide VoIP provider Iristel and led the rollout of the Ice Wireless mobile network across the Yukon, Northwest Territories and Nunavut.

Zubko is a strong advocate for improving telecommunications in Canada and Canada's northern regions.

Biography 
Born in Montreal, Quebec, Zubko received a Bachelor of International Business from University of Victoria

Career 
Before joining Ice Wireless, Zubko spent ten years in finance and government affairs in London, New York City, and Beijing.

Zubko currently resides in Vancouver, British Columbia. He is a former member of the City of Vancouver's Urban Indigenous Peoples' Advisory Committee.

References

1975 births
Canadian people of Ukrainian descent
Living people
Businesspeople from Montreal